The Many Glacier Campground Camptender's Cabin in Glacier National Park is an example of the National Park Service Rustic style. Built in 1934, the small cabin is significant for its association with park visitation patterns, auto camping, and NPS rustic architecture.

The Many Glacier Campground is located approximately 2 miles west of the Many Glacier Hotel and south of the Swiftcurrent Auto Camp. The Camptender's cabin is centrally located within the campground, amidst heavy timber. It is a single-story rectangular building constructed of an exposed-log framing system with vertical-plank siding. The building rests on a concrete-pier foundation and is covered by a log-frame side-gable roof surfaced with wood shingles. Pole purlins and rafters are exposed and the roof features a stone chimney extending from the gable ridge. A 2-step stoop of coursed, cut stone provides access to the vertical-plank door offset within the north elevation. Windows are 6 or 4-light wood frame, casement, arranged in groups of 2 or 3.

See also
Two Medicine Campground Camptender's Cabin
Many Glacier Barn and Bunkhouse
Many Glacier Hotel

References

Park buildings and structures on the National Register of Historic Places in Montana
National Register of Historic Places in Glacier County, Montana
National Register of Historic Places in Glacier National Park
National Park Service rustic in Montana
Camping in the United States
Residential buildings completed in 1934
Residential buildings on the National Register of Historic Places in Montana
1934 establishments in Montana